Lighter fluid or lighter fuel may refer to:
 Butane, a highly flammable, colourless, easily liquefied gas used in gas-type lighters and butane torches
 Naphtha, a volatile flammable liquid hydrocarbon mixture used in wick-type lighters and burners
 Charcoal lighter fluid, an aliphatic petroleum solvent used in lighting charcoal in a barbecue grill